"The Tale of the Unknown Island" is a short story by Portuguese author José Saramago. It was published in Portuguese in 1997, and English in 1999.

Plot

A man requests the king of his country to give him a boat so he can go in search for "the unknown island". The king questions him about the existence of such an island and tries to convince the man that all islands already appear on maps. The man states that only the known islands do. This debate concludes with the king granting him a boat.

Adaptation
An adaptation was staged at the Gate Theatre, Notting Hill in September/October 2017.

References

1997 short stories
Short stories by José Saramago